The 2013 Men's EuroHockey Nations Championship IV was the fifth edition of the EuroHockey Championship IV, the fourth level of the men's European field hockey championships organized by the European Hockey Federation. It was held in Athens, Greece from 21 to 26 July 2013.

Greece promoted to the 2015 EuroHockey Nations Championship III by finishing top in this round-robin tournament.

Results

Standings

Matches

See also
2013 Men's EuroHockey Championship III

References

EuroHockey Championship IV
Men 4
EuroHockey Championship IV
Sports competitions in Athens
International field hockey competitions hosted by Greece
EuroHockey Championship IV
2010s in Athens